Roluperidone (former developmental code names MIN-101, CYR-101, MT-210) is a 5-HT2A and σ2 receptor antagonist under development by Minerva Neurosciences for the treatment of schizophrenia. One of its metabolites also has some affinity for the H1 receptor. Pre-clinical findings provide evidence of the effect of roluperidone on Brain-Derived Neurotrophic Factor (“BDNF”), which has been associated with neurogenesis, neuroplasticity, neuroprotection, synapse regulation, learning and memory. As of May 2018, the drug was in phase III clinical trials. In May 2020, the shares of Minerva Neurosciences plummeted 67% after the trial "failed to meet its primary endpoint of reduction in negative symptoms, and key secondary endpoints of improvement in personal and social performance measurements." However, in August of 2022 Minerva submitted a New Drug Application (NDA) to the Food and Drug Administration (FDA) for the approval of roluperidone for the treatment of schizophrenia.  The NDA submission in 2022 followed successful completion of a phase III clinical trial which was published in early 2022. Minerva believed that the findings of this second trial supported the claim that the drug was an effective agent for the treatment of negative symptoms in schizophrenia. However, in October 2022, FDA sent Minerva a refusal to file letter pertaining to the New Drug Application for roluperidone for treating negative symptoms in schizophrenia patients.

See also 
 List of investigational antipsychotics
 Risperidone
 Paliperidone
 Iloperidone
 Glemanserin
 Pruvanserin
 Volinanserin
 Lenperone
 Lidanserin
 MIN-117
 MIN-202

References 

5-HT2A antagonists
Antipsychotics
Isoindoles
Ketones
Organofluorides
Piperidines
Sigma antagonists